Back Stage is a 1917 American short comedy film featuring Oliver Hardy.

Cast 
 Billy West as Props
 Ethel Marie Burton as Ethel (as Ethel Burton)
 Polly Bailey (as Polly Van)
 Joe Cohen
 Ethelyn Gibson (as Ethelynne Gibson)
 Oliver Hardy (as Babe Hardy)
 Florence McLaughlin (as Florence McLoughlin)
 Bud Ross (as Budd Ross)
 Leo White

Reception
Like many American films of the time, Back Stage was subject to cuts by city and state film censorship boards. For example, the Chicago Board of Censors required a cut of closeups of hula dancers and the actions of a bearded man backstage, and the scene of three women falling in the back of the stage and baring their legs.

See also 
 List of American films of 1917
 Oliver Hardy filmography

References

External links 
 

1917 films
1917 short films
1917 comedy films
American silent short films
Silent American comedy films
American black-and-white films
Films directed by Arvid E. Gillstrom
American comedy short films
1910s American films